Ave Alavainu (4 October 1942 – 3 April 2022) was an Estonian poet and writer. She was born in Tartu on 4 October 1942 and died  on 3 April 2022 at the age of 79. She attended the Tallinn Pedagogical Institute (1962–64), studying Estonian philology, and Tartu State University (1964–67).

References

External links 
 

1942 births
2022 deaths
20th-century Estonian poets
20th-century Estonian women writers
Estonian women poets
Tallinn University alumni
University of Tartu alumni
Writers from Tartu
Recipients of the Order of the White Star, 5th Class